The Analyst, or, Mathematical Museum was an early American mathematics journal.  Founded by Robert Adrain in 1808, it published one volume of four issues that year before discontinuing publication.  Despite its extremely short life, it published papers by several notable mathematicians in the nascent American mathematical community, including Nathaniel Bowditch and Ferdinand Hassler; most importantly, Adrain himself published an independent formulation of the method of least squares.

After securing a professorship at Columbia University, Adrain attempted to revive the journal in 1814, but it published only one issue before again ceasing publication. He would later go on to found a more popularly oriented journal, The Mathematical Diary.

References

Defunct journals of the United States
Mathematics journals
Publications established in 1808
Publications disestablished in 1808
Publications established in 1814
Publications disestablished in 1814